Brihadbala is a king featured in Hindu mythology. He is a character in the Hindu epic Mahabharata. He is described to be the last king of the Kosala Kingdom. In the Kurukshetra War, Brihadbala fights for the Kauravas and is killed by Abhimanyu.

Legend
According to the Vishnu Purana and the Bhagavata Purana, Brihadbala is a descendant of Rama on Kusha's side, and belongs to the Suryavamsha (Solar dynasty). Makhan Jha, in his Anthropology of Ancient Hindu Kingdoms: A Study in Civilizational Perspective claims that Brihadbala is the fifteenth king after Rama. Brihadbala is considered to be the last king of the line of Ikshvaku; the dynasty spanned 31-32 generations between Rama and him.

The Mahabharata describes Brihadbala as the ruler of Kingdom of Kosala. He was subjugated by Bhima during the Rajasuya sacrifice, and a subsequent conquest by Karna during the latter's Digvijaya Yatra caused him to side with the Kauravas during the Kurukshetra War. On the thirteenth day of the war, when Abhimanyu, Arjuna's son, penetrates into the Padmavyuha, Brihadbala fights him, along with a host of Kaurava warriors including Drona, Kripa, Karna, Ashwatthama, and Kritavarma. In a fierce duel that ensured between him and Abhimanyu, he gets mortally hit by the latter's arrows.

According to the Shiva Purana, Brihadbala is succeeded by his son, Barhināman.

References

Solar dynasty
Characters in the Mahabharata